The Holy Transfiguration Monastery is a Serbian Orthodox monastery. It is located in Campbellville, Milton, Ontario and it serves as the headquarters of the Eparchy of Canada.

It is the first and only Serbian Orthodox monastery in Canada.

History
The monastery was built on 43 acres of land purchased in 1984 and blessed four years later in 1988. Beside the Holy Transfiguration Church, there is a residence, library and museum with over 10,000 books. The frescoes were painted by Mr. Dragan Marunic, the famous painter from Belgrade, Serbia. Upon completion, the monastery was blessed by the Serbian Patriarch Pavle on June 12, 1994. 

The first Serbian cemetery in Canada is located on the grounds of the Holy Transfiguration Monastery. Many relics are kept in the monastery such as holy bones of St. Vasily, St. Irina, St. Ignatius and many others. Since the land surrounding the monastery is used as a picnic area during summer, there are playgrounds, and many sports fields allowing its visitors to engage in various sports activities such as soccer, basketball or volleyball.

See also
 Saint Nicholas Serbian Orthodox Cathedral (Hamilton, Ontario)
 All Serbian Saints Serbian Orthodox Church (Mississauga)
 Serbian Canadians

References

See also
Serbian Orthodox Eparchy of Canada
Holy Trinity Serbian Orthodox Church (Montreal)
Saint Sava Serbian Orthodox Church (Toronto)
All Serbian Saints Serbian Orthodox Church (Mississauga)
Saint Michael the Archangel Serbian Orthodox Church (Toronto)
St. Stefan Serbian Orthodox Church (Ottawa)
Saint Nicholas Serbian Orthodox Cathedral (Hamilton, Ontario)

External links
 

Serbian Orthodox church buildings in Canada
Eastern Orthodox church buildings in Canada
Serbian Orthodox monasteries
Serbian-Canadian culture
Serbian Orthodox Church in Canada